Michigan City may refer to:

 Michigan City, California
 Michigan City, Indiana, the most populous place with this name
 Michigan City, Mississippi
 Michigan City, North Dakota
 Michigan City station (disambiguation), stations of the name
 Rawsonville, Michigan, community platted as Michigan City, now a ghost town under a lake

See also
 Michigan Center, Michigan, a city with Michigan in its name.